Bombshell is a 2019 drama film directed by Jay Roach and written by Charles Randolph. The film stars Charlize Theron, Nicole Kidman, and Margot Robbie, and is based upon the accounts of the women at Fox News who set out to expose CEO Roger Ailes for sexual harassment. John Lithgow, Kate McKinnon, Connie Britton, Malcolm McDowell, and Allison Janney appear in supporting roles.

The project was first announced in May 2017 following Ailes's death, with Roach confirmed as director the following year. Much of the cast joined that summer and filming began in October 2018 in Los Angeles. It entered into a limited release in the United States on December 13, 2019, before a wide release on December 20, by Lionsgate.

Bombshells box office results were seen as disappointing but the film received mostly favorable reviews, praising its acting as well as its choices of makeup and hair but some criticizing the screenplay and inaccuracies. At the 92nd Academy Awards, it earned three nominations: Best Actress (Theron), Best Supporting Actress (Robbie), and Best Makeup and Hairstyling, winning the latter. The film also received two nominations at the 77th Golden Globe Awards (for Theron and Robbie), four at the 26th Screen Actors Guild Awards (Theron, Robbie, and Kidman, as well as Outstanding Performance by a Cast in a Motion Picture) and three at the 73rd British Academy Film Awards (Theron, Robbie, and Best Makeup and Hair). The theme song, "One Little Soldier", performed by Regina Spektor, won the 2020 "Best Song Written or Recorded for a Film" from the Guild of Music Supervisors Awards.

Plot
After co-moderating the 2016 Republican debate, Megyn Kelly faces numerous insults from Donald Trump, who is upset because she asked him about his offensive comments toward women. Under pressure from the network, and after receiving death threats and unwanted paparazzi attention, Kelly eventually reconciles with Trump.

Meanwhile, Gretchen Carlson is removed as co-anchor of the popular Fox and Friends show, and is transferred to a less popular show. Inundated by sexist comments on and off the air, including by Roger Ailes, Carlson meets with lawyers, Nancy Smith and Neil Mullin, who explain that Carlson's contract prevents her from suing the network, but she can sue Ailes personally.

On her first day on The O'Reilly Factor, Kayla Pospisil meets fellow female staffer Jess Carr, and the two sleep together. The next day, Ailes begins sexually harassing Pospisil. Pospisil begins to tell Carr about what happened, but Carr interrupts, saying she cannot get involved.

Carlson is later fired, ostensibly for her on-air support of the federal assault weapons ban, and decides to sue Ailes. When the news breaks the next day, Ailes denies the allegations and Kelly admits to her core team Ailes sexually harassed her when she started at Fox. In the following weeks, despite a number of other women voicing their public support against Ailes, Kelly conspicuously refuses to make a comment on Carlson's accusations.

Fox News retains the Paul Weiss firm to conduct an internal investigation.

After more women accuse Ailes, Kelly starts to find other women at the network. Kelly visits Pospisil, and the two confide in each other. Kelly advises Pospisil to come forward, and after consulting with Carr, she does. Through her attorneys, Carlson later informs Ailes she has recorded conversations to support her claims, deliberately withholding them from Ailes’s lawyers in order to undermine his credibility. Defeated, Ailes is fired by Fox co-creator Rupert Murdoch. Ailes settles Carlson's lawsuit for $20 million and an apology from Fox, but the agreement contains a non-disclosure agreement. Fox eventually paid the victims of sexual harassment $50 million, while paying Ailes and O'Reilly $65 million in severance.

Cast

Production

Development
On May 18, 2017, shortly after the death of Fox News founder Roger Ailes, it was announced that Annapurna Pictures was in the early stages of developing a film centered on the allegations made against Ailes by female employees, including Megyn Kelly and Gretchen Carlson. Charles Randolph was expected to write the film's screenplay. On May 22, 2018, it was announced that Jay Roach had been hired to direct the film. On August 1, 2018, it was announced that Roach, Randolph, Beth Kono, AJ Dix, and Margaret Riley would act as the film's producers and that Denver and Delilah Productions would serve as the film's production company. On October 9, 2018, it was announced that Annapurna Pictures had dropped out of producing the film, reportedly due to concerns over the film's growing budget. At the time of the announcement, it was confirmed that Bron Studios was staying on and that producers were looking at Focus Features, Participant Media, and Amblin Entertainment to help finance the film. The following week, Lionsgate began negotiating to join the production after Focus Features and Amblin Entertainment passed on the project. By the end of the month, Lionsgate was reported to be closing a deal to distribute the film. In December 2018, it was reported that Theodore Shapiro would compose the film's score and that Barry Ackroyd would serve as the film's cinematographer. The film was given the working title Fair and Balanced, before being announced as Bombshell in August 2019. Kelly later stated that she had no involvement with the film.

Casting
Alongside the directing and writing announcements, it was reported that Charlize Theron had entered negotiations to portray Kelly in the film. On August 1, 2018, it was reported that Nicole Kidman had begun negotiations to star as Carlson and that Margot Robbie was in talks to play a composite associate producer at the network, with Theron confirmed to star. Later that month, it was announced that John Lithgow had been cast as Roger Ailes. In September 2018, it was reported that Allison Janney had been cast as lawyer Susan Estrich and that Kate McKinnon had been cast to play a fictional producer.

In October 2018, it was announced that Malcolm McDowell, Mark Duplass, and Alice Eve had been cast as Rupert Murdoch, Douglas Brunt, and Ainsley Earhardt, respectively. In November 2018, it was reported that Brigette Lundy-Paine and Liv Hewson had been cast as two fictional characters and that Alanna Ubach, Elisabeth Röhm, Spencer Garrett, Connie Britton, Ashley Greene, Brooke Smith, Michael Buie, Nazanin Boniadi, and Bree Condon had been cast as Jeanine Pirro, Martha MacCallum, Sean Hannity, Beth Ailes, Abby Huntsman, Irena Brigante, Bret Baier, Rudi Bakhtiar, and Kimberly Guilfoyle, respectively. In December 2018, it was announced that Rob Delaney had joined the cast of the film in an undisclosed role and that Ahna O'Reilly had been cast as Julie Roginsky. In June 2019, Robin Weigert announced she had joined the cast of the film.

Filming
Principal photography for the film began on October 22, 2018, in Los Angeles, California.

Release
The film was scheduled for release on December 20, 2019. However, it was pushed up to December 13, 2019, in a limited release, opening wide on December 20.

Reception

Box office
Bombshell grossed $31.8 million in the United States and Canada, and $29.6 million in other territories, for a worldwide total of $61.4 million.

In its limited opening weekend the film made $312,100 from four theaters for a per-venue average of $78,025, the fifth best of 2019. The film went wide at 1,480 theaters the following weekend and, despite being projected to gross around $10 million, finished sixth with $5.1 million. The audience was 58% female, with 60% being between 18 and 34 years old. The following weekend the film made $4.7 million (a total of $8.3 million over the five-day Christmas frame), falling to ninth. The film's box office results were seen as a disappointment, with The Hill saying that the presence of other projects about Ailes, such as the documentary Divide and Conquer: The Story of Roger Ailes and the Showtime series The Loudest Voice, had lowered the demand for a film on the subject. Forbes also noted that audiences likely do not want to "shell out movie theater money and time to watch a film about women being treated terribly by powerful men... especially (generally speaking) women".

Critical response

The website's critics consensus reads: "Bombshell benefits from a terrific cast and a worthy subject, but its impact is muffled by a frustrating inability to go deeper than the sensationalistic surface." On Metacritic, the film has a weighted average score of 64 out of 100, based on reviews from 46 critics, indicating "generally favorable reviews." Audiences polled by PostTrak gave the film an average 4 out of 5 stars, with 70% saying they would definitely recommend it.

Varietys Owen Gleiberman gave the film a positive review and wrote: "Bombshell is a scalding and powerful movie about what selling, in America, has become. The film is about selling sex, selling a candidate, selling yourself, selling the truth. And about how at Fox News all those things came together." Todd McCarthy of The Hollywood Reporter wrote: "The actors throw themselves into their roles with terrific zeal, enlivened by the often blunt dialogue and the issues at stake." Kevin Maher of The Times gave the film 4/5 stars, describing it as "a timely satirical takedown that finds black humour and absurdist comedy in the subject of workplace sexual harassment while never losing sight of its devastating repercussions." Ann Hornaday of The Washington Post gave the film 3/4 stars, calling it "an absorbing, well-crafted chronicle of the sexual harassment accusations that forced Fox News founding CEO Roger Ailes to resign in disgrace."

Moira Macdonald of The Seattle Times gave the film 2/4 stars, writing that it "went wrong"; much of it due to Charles Randolph's "cutesy screenplay ... which unfolds at a cartoony pace more suitable to a dark comedy." Simran Hans of The Observer gave the film 2/5 stars, writing: "What happened to these women is appalling; that the film takes such pains to sand down the politics of its central characters to make them more sympathetic undermines its entire thesis. Kelly’s racist attitudes are smoothed over, while Carlson's homophobia is conveniently erased." Hans goes on to argue that the film would have been more complete had it engaged with the "tension" between its protagonists' dual roles as perpetuators of sexism themselves, owing to their status as conservative icons, and also as women harmed by a deeply sexist organization. Hans contends that by presenting the protagonists simply as sympathetic characters the film fails to make sufficient criticism of these women and their role as cogs in an organization which espouses rightwing ideology. Linda Holmes of NPR wrote: "It has a few strong moments, mostly courtesy of Robbie, but it's both underwhelming and overworked, inelegantly structured and missing something fundamental at the core." Joe Morgenstern of The Wall Street Journal said that the film was "a movie with a compelling story to tell turns into a blunt-force polemic that can't stop hammering its message home."

Reactions from the depicted
In January 2020, Kelly posted a 30-minute video on her YouTube channel of a roundtable discussion, including her, Huddy, Bakhtiar, Brunt and former Fox News producer Julie Zann and their reactions and opinions after viewing a screening of the film. The panel confirmed many details depicted, including having to do the "spin" to show off their bodies to Ailes in private; Zann tearfully noted that reality was "worse than that" and the filmmakers "let Roger off easy". Kelly took particular issue with the scene where Robbie's character blames Kelly for not speaking up, calling the scene victim blaming and noting that the scene was "written by a man"; however, she also noted that the scene belongs in the film as a reminder to herself that she could have done more to help other victims. She also felt the film "took liberties" with her story and specifically denied that she told Murdoch the question she was going to ask Donald Trump in advance of the debate or that Ailes liked the question. "The notion that Roger liked the Donald Trump 'woman' question because it created controversy and a TV moment was not true. Roger did not like the question — at all — and was very angry at me for asking it. At one point [he] actually said to me, 'No more female empowerment stuff!'."

Accolades

See also
 New Yorkers in journalism
 The Loudest Voice (2019) – A miniseries based on the life of Roger Ailes, which also depicts the events leading up to his departure from Fox News.

References

External links
 
 

2010s English-language films
2010s American films
2010s Canadian films
2010s feminist films
2019 films
2019 drama films
2019 biographical drama films
2019 LGBT-related films
American biographical drama films
American feminist films
American LGBT-related films
Canadian biographical drama films
Canadian LGBT-related films
Drama films based on actual events
Biographical films about journalists
Films about lawsuits
Films about sexual harassment
Films about television people
Films about companies
Works about Fox News
Cultural depictions of Rupert Murdoch
Cultural depictions of Donald Trump
Films directed by Jay Roach
Films produced by Charlize Theron
Films scored by Theodore Shapiro
Lesbian-related films
LGBT-related drama films
LGBT-related films based on actual events
Films set in 2015
Films set in 2016
Films set in New York City
Films shot in Los Angeles
Lionsgate films
Annapurna Pictures films
Bron Studios films
Films that won the Academy Award for Best Makeup
BAFTA winners (films)